Josephine Yuenling Wu (born 20 January 1995) is a Canadian badminton player. Josephine is currently a business student at the University of Alberta and has been competing in badminton since she was seven years old.

Career
As a junior, she has won 29 provincial titles and was a member of Team Canada at the 2012 BWF World Junior Championships and the Pan Am Junior Badminton Championships from 2008 to 2013. Despite having a full course load in university, Josephine's passion for the sport has motivated her to continue balancing her school work and training. She was the mixed doubles winner at the 2014 College-University National Championships and went on to represent Canada at the 2014 World University Badminton Championships in Cordoba, Spain. Outside of training, Josephine also enjoys coaching her high school's badminton team. In 2016, she won the gold medal in the mixed team event at the Pan Am Badminton Championships. In the individual event, she won the Pan Am Championships gold medals in the women's doubles in 2016, and 2017, and also in the mixed doubles in 2018, 2019 and 2021. Wu was a gold medalist in the mixed doubles event at the 2019 Lima Pan American Games.

In June 2021, Wu was named to Canada's Olympic team, competing in the mixed doubles badminton event but was eliminated in the group stage.

Achievements

Pan American Games 
Mixed doubles

Pan Am Championships 
Women's doubles

Mixed doubles

Pan Am Junior Championships 
Girls' singles

Girls' doubles

Mixed doubles

BWF International Challenge/Series (10 titles, 2 runners-up) 
Women's doubles

Mixed doubles

  BWF International Challenge tournament
  BWF International Series tournament

References

External links 
 

1995 births
Living people
Sportspeople from Edmonton
Canadian female badminton players
Canadian sportspeople of Chinese descent
Badminton players at the 2020 Summer Olympics
Olympic badminton players of Canada
Badminton players at the 2022 Commonwealth Games
Commonwealth Games competitors for Canada
Badminton players at the 2019 Pan American Games
Pan American Games gold medalists for Canada
Pan American Games medalists in badminton
Medalists at the 2019 Pan American Games
20th-century Canadian women
21st-century Canadian women